The Communauté de communes du Saint-Polois was located in the Pas-de-Calais département, in northern France. It was created in January 1996. In January 2013 it was merged into the new Communauté de communes des Vertes Collines du Saint-Polois, which was merged into the new Communauté de communes du Ternois in January 2017.

Composition
It comprised the following 43 communes:

Averdoingt  
Beauvois 
Bermicourt  
Blangerval-Blangermont 
Brias  
Buneville 
Croisette  
Croix-en-Ternois  
Écoivres 
Flers 
Foufflin-Ricametz  
Framecourt  
Gauchin-Verloingt  
Gouy-en-Ternois  
Guinecourt 
Hautecloque 
Héricourt 
Herlin-le-Sec 
Herlincourt  
Hernicourt  
Humerœuille 
Humières 
Ligny-Saint-Flochel  
Linzeux  
Maisnil  
Marquay  
Moncheaux-lès-Frévent  
Monchy-Breton  
Monts-en-Ternois 
Neuville-au-Cornet  
Œuf-en-Ternois  
Ostreville  
Pierremont  
Ramecourt  
Roëllecourt  
Saint-Michel-sur-Ternoise  
Saint-Pol-sur-Ternoise 
Séricourt 
Sibiville 
Siracourt  
Ternas  
Troisvaux  
Wavrans-sur-Ternoise

References 

Saint-Polois